The 2019 Men's Pan-American Volleyball Cup was the 14th edition of the annual men's volleyball tournament. It was held in Colima City, Colima, Mexico from 16 to 21 June. Twelve teams will compete in the tournament.

Cuba won the title after defeating the two-time defending champions Argentina in the final by 3–2. Miguel Ángel López was awarded the Most Valuable Player.

Pools composition

Venue
 Auditorio Multifuncional de Colima, Colima City, Mexico

Pool standing procedure
 Number of matches won
 Match points
 Points ratio
 Sets ratio
 Result of the last match between the tied teams

Match won 3–0: 5 match points for the winner, 0 match points for the loser
Match won 3–1: 4 match points for the winner, 1 match point for the loser
Match won 3–2: 3 match points for the winner, 2 match points for the loser

Preliminary round
All times are Central Daylight Time (UTC−05:00).

Pool A

Pool B

Pool C

Final round

Championship bracket

7th–10th places bracket

11th place match

Classification 7th–10th

Quarterfinals

9th place match

7th place match

Semifinals

5th place match

3rd place match

Final

Final standing

{| class="wikitable" style="text-align:center"
|-
!width=40|Rank
!width=180|Team
|-
|
|style="text-align:left"|
|-
|
|style="text-align:left"|
|-
|
|style="text-align:left"|
|- bgcolor=#ccffcc
|4
|style="text-align:left"|
|-
|5
|style="text-align:left"|
|-
|6
|style="text-align:left"|
|-
|7
|style="text-align:left"|
|-
|8
|style="text-align:left"|
|-
|9
|style="text-align:left"|
|-
|10
|style="text-align:left"|
|-
|11
|style="text-align:left"|
|-
|12
|style="text-align:left"|
|}

Individual awards

Most Valuable Player
  Miguel Ángel López
Best Setter
  Pedro Rangel
Best Outside Hitters
  Álvaro Hidalgo
  Nicolás Bruno
Best Middle Blockers
  Daniel Urueña
  Roamy Alonso
Best Opposite
  Eduardo Romay
Best Scorer
  Eduardo Romay
Best Server
  Eduardo Romay
Best Libero
  Arnel Cabrera
Best Digger
  Kyle Dagostino
Best Receiver
  Jorge Barajas

References

Men's Pan-American Volleyball Cup
Pan-American Volleyball Cup
International volleyball competitions hosted by Mexico
2019 in Mexican sports
Sport in Colima
Pan-American Volleyball Cup